The Burgundians were an early Germanic tribe or group of tribes. They appeared in the middle Rhine region, near the Roman Empire, and were later moved into the empire, in the western Alps and eastern Gaul. They were possibly mentioned much earlier in the time of the Roman Empire as living in part of the region of Germania that is now part of Poland.

The Burgundians are first mentioned together with the Alamanni as early as the 11th panegyric to emperor Maximian given in Trier in 291 AD, referring to events that must have happened between 248 and 291, and they apparently remained neighbours for centuries. By 411 a Burgundian group had established themselves on the Rhine, between Franks and Alamanni, holding the cities of Worms, Speyer, and Strasbourg. In 436 AD, Aëtius defeated the Burgundians on the Rhine with the help of Hunnish forces, and then in 443, he re-settled the Burgundians within the empire, in eastern Gaul.

This Gaulish domain became the Kingdom of the Burgundians, in the western Alps region. This later became a component of the Frankish Empire. The name of this kingdom survives in the regional appellation, Burgundy, which is a region in modern France, representing only a part of that kingdom.

Another part of the Burgundians formed a contingent in Attila's Hunnic army by 451 AD.

Before clear documentary evidence begins, the Burgundians may have originally emigrated from mainland Scandinavia to the Baltic island of Bornholm, and from there to the Vistula basin, in the middle of what is now Poland.

Name
The ethnonym Burgundians is commonly used in English to refer to the Burgundi (Burgundionei, Burgundiones or Burgunds) who settled in eastern Gaul and the western Alps during the 5th century AD. The original Kingdom of the Burgundians barely intersected the modern Bourgogne and more closely matched the boundaries of Franche-Comté in northeastern France, the Rhône-Alpes in southeastern France, Romandy in west Switzerland, and Aosta Valley, in north west Italy.

In modern usage, however, "Burgundians" can sometimes refer to later inhabitants of the geographical Bourgogne or Borgogne (Burgundy), named after the old kingdom, but not corresponding to the original boundaries of it. Between the 6th and 20th centuries, the boundaries and political connections of "Burgundy" have changed frequently. In modern times the only area still referred to as Burgundy is in France, which derives its name from the Duchy of Burgundy. But in the context of the Middle Ages the term Burgundian (or similar spellings) can refer even to the powerful political entity the Dukes controlled which included not only Burgundy itself but had actually expanded to have a strong association with areas now in modern Belgium and Southern Netherlands. The parts of the old Kingdom not within the French controlled Duchy tended to come under different names, except for the County of Burgundy.

History

Uncertain early history

The origins of the Burgundians before they reached the area near the Roman-controlled Rhine is a subject of various old proposals, but these are doubted by some modern scholars such as Ian Wood and Walter Goffart. As remarked by Susan Reynolds:

They have long been associated with Scandinavian origin based on place-name evidence and archaeological evidence (Stjerna) and many consider their tradition to be correct (e.g. Musset, p. 62). According to such proposals, the Burgundians are believed to have then emigrated to the Baltic island of Bornholm ("the island of the Burgundians" in Old Norse). By about 250 AD, the population of Bornholm had largely disappeared from the island. Most cemeteries ceased to be used, and those that were still used had few burials (Stjerna, in German 1925:176). In Þorsteins saga Víkingssonar (The Saga of Thorstein, Viking's Son), a man (or group) named Veseti settled on a holm (island) called borgundarhólmr in Old Norse, i.e. Bornholm. Alfred the Great's translation of Orosius uses the name Burgenda land to refer to a territory next to the land of Sweons ("Swedes"). The 19th century poet and mythologist Viktor Rydberg asserted from an early medieval source, Vita Sigismundi, that they themselves retained oral traditions about their Scandinavian origin.

Early Roman sources, such as Tacitus and Pliny the Elder, knew little concerning the Germanic peoples east of the Elbe river, or on the Baltic Sea. Pliny (IV.28) however mentions a group with a similar name among the Vandalic or Eastern Germanic Germani peoples, including the Goths. Claudius Ptolemy lists these as living between the Suevus (probably the Oder) and Vistula rivers, north of the Lugii, and south of the coast dwelling tribes. Around the mid-2nd century AD, there was a significant migration by Germanic tribes of Scandinavian origin (Rugii, Goths, Gepidae, Vandals, Burgundians, and others) towards the south-east, creating turmoil along the entire Roman frontier. These migrations culminated in the Marcomannic Wars, which resulted in widespread destruction and the first invasion of Italy in the Roman Empire period. Jordanes reports that during the 3rd century AD, the Burgundians living in the Vistula basin were almost annihilated by Fastida, king of the Gepids, whose kingdom was at the mouth of the Vistula.

In the late 3rd century AD, the Burgundians appeared on the east bank of the Rhine, apparently confronting Roman Gaul. Zosimus (1.68) reports them being defeated by the emperor Probus in 278 near a river, together with the Silingi and Vandals. A few years later, Claudius Mamertinus mentions them along with the Alamanni, a Suebic people. These two peoples had moved into the Agri Decumates on the eastern side of the Rhine, an area still referred to today as Swabia, at times attacking Roman Gaul together and sometimes fighting each other. He also mentions that the Goths had previously defeated the Burgundians.

Ammianus Marcellinus, on the other hand, claimed that the Burgundians descended from the Romans. The Roman sources do not speak of any specific migration from Poland by the Burgundians (although other Vandalic peoples are more clearly mentioned as having moved west in this period), and so there have historically been some doubts about the link between the eastern and western Burgundians.

In 369/370 AD, the Emperor Valentinian I enlisted the aid of the Burgundians in his war against the Alamanni. 

Approximately four decades later, the Burgundians appear again. Following Stilicho's withdrawal of troops to fight Alaric I the Visigoth in 406–408 AD, a large group of peoples from central Europe north of the Danube came west and crossed the Rhine, entering the Empire near the lands of the Burgundians who had moved much earlier. The dominant groups were Alans, Vandals (Hasdingi and Silingi), and Danubian Suevi. The majority of these Danubian peoples moved through Gaul and eventually established themselves in kingdoms in Roman Hispania. One group of Alans was settled in northern Gaul by the Romans.

Some Burgundians also migrated westwards and settled as foederati in the Roman province of Germania Prima along the Middle Rhine. Other Burgundians, however, remained outside the empire and apparently formed a contingent in Attila's Hunnic army by 451 AD.

Kingdom

Rhineland
In 411, the Burgundian king Gundahar (or Gundicar) set up a puppet emperor, Jovinus, in cooperation with Goar, king of the Alans. With the authority of the Gallic emperor that he controlled, Gundahar settled on the left (Roman) bank of the Rhine, between the river Lauter and the Nahe, seizing Worms, Speyer, and Strassburg. Apparently as part of a truce, the Emperor Honorius later officially "granted" them the land, with its capital at the old Celtic Roman settlement of Borbetomagus (present Worms).

Despite their new status as foederati, Burgundian raids into Roman Upper Gallia Belgica became intolerable and were ruthlessly brought to an end in 436, when the Roman general Aëtius called in Hun mercenaries, who overwhelmed the Rhineland kingdom in 437. Gundahar was killed in the fighting, reportedly along with the majority of the Burgundian tribe.

The destruction of Worms and the Burgundian kingdom by the Huns became the subject of heroic legends that were afterwards incorporated in the Nibelungenlied—on which Wagner based his Ring Cycle—where King Gunther (Gundahar) and Queen Brünhild hold their court at Worms, and Siegfried comes to woo Kriemhild. (In Old Norse sources the names are Gunnar, Brynhild, and Gudrún as normally rendered in English.) In fact, the Etzel of the Nibelungenlied is based on Attila the Hun.

Settlement in eastern Gaul

For reasons not cited in the sources, the Burgundians were granted foederati status a second time, and in 443 were resettled by Aëtius in the region of Maxima Sequanorum. The Burgundians expanded their realm south into Sapaudia, which corresponds to the modern-day Savoy, and Burgundians probably even lived near Lugdunum, known today as Lyon. A new king, Gundioc or Gunderic, presumed to be Gundahar's son, appears to have reigned following his father's death. The historian Pline tells us that Gunderic ruled the areas of Saône, Dauphiny, Savoie and a part of Provence. He set up Vienne as the capital of the kingdom of Burgundy. In all, eight Burgundian kings of the house of Gundahar ruled until the kingdom was overrun by the Franks in 534.

As allies of Rome in its last decades, the Burgundians fought alongside Aëtius and a confederation of Visigoths and others against Attila at the Battle of Châlons (also called "The Battle of the Catalaunian Fields") in 451. The alliance between Burgundians and Visigoths seems to have been strong, as Gundioc and his brother Chilperic I accompanied Theodoric II to Spain to fight the Sueves in 455.

Aspirations to the empire
Also in 455, an ambiguous reference infidoque tibi Burdundio ductu implicates an unnamed treacherous Burgundian leader in the murder of the emperor Petronius Maximus in the chaos preceding the sack of Rome by the Vandals. The Patrician Ricimer is also blamed; this event marks the first indication of the link between the Burgundians and Ricimer, who was probably Gundioc's brother-in-law and Gundobad's uncle.

In 456, the Burgundians, apparently confident in their growing power, negotiated a territorial expansion and power sharing arrangement with the local Roman senators.

In 457, Ricimer overthrew another emperor, Avitus, raising Majorian to the throne. This new emperor proved unhelpful to Ricimer and the Burgundians. The year after his ascension, Majorian stripped the Burgundians of the lands they had acquired two years earlier. After showing further signs of independence, he was murdered by Ricimer in 461.

Ten years later, in 472, Ricimer–who was by now the son-in-law of the Western Emperor Anthemius–was plotting with Gundobad to kill his father-in-law; Gundobad beheaded the emperor (apparently personally). Ricimer then appointed Olybrius; both died, surprisingly of natural causes, within a few months. Gundobad seems then to have succeeded his uncle as Patrician and king-maker, and raised Glycerius to the throne.

In 474, Burgundian influence over the empire seems to have ended. Glycerius was deposed in favor of Julius Nepos, and Gundobad returned to Burgundy, presumably at the death of his father Gundioc. At this time or shortly afterwards, the Burgundian kingdom was divided among Gundobad and his brothers, Godigisel, Chilperic II, and Gundomar I.

Consolidation of the kingdom

According to Gregory of Tours, the years following Gundobad's return to Burgundy saw a bloody consolidation of power. Gregory states that Gundobad murdered his brother Chilperic, drowning his wife and exiling their daughters (one of whom was to become the wife of Clovis the Frank, and was reputedly responsible for his conversion). This is contested by, e.g., Bury, who points out problems in much of Gregory's chronology for the events.

In c. 500, when Gundobad and Clovis were at war, Gundobad appears to have been betrayed by his brother Godegisel, who joined the Franks; together Godegisel's and Clovis' forces "crushed the army of Gundobad". Gundobad was temporarily holed up in Avignon, but was able to re-muster his army and sacked Vienne, where Godegisel and many of his followers were put to death. From this point, Gundobad appears to have been the sole king of Burgundy. This would imply that his brother Gundomar was already dead, though there are no specific mentions of the event in the sources.

Either Gundobad and Clovis reconciled their differences, or Gundobad was forced into some sort of vassalage by Clovis' earlier victory, as the Burgundian king appears to have assisted the Franks in 507 in their victory over Alaric II the Visigoth.

During the upheaval, sometime between 483 and 501, Gundobad began to set forth the Lex Gundobada (see below), issuing roughly the first half, which drew upon the Lex Visigothorum. Following his consolidation of power, between 501 and his death in 516, Gundobad issued the second half of his law, which was more originally Burgundian.

Fall

The Burgundians were extending their power over eastern Gaul—that is western Switzerland and eastern France, as well as northern Italy. In 493, Clovis, king of the Franks, married the Burgundian princess Clotilda (daughter of Chilperic), who converted him to the Catholic faith.

At first allied with Clovis' Franks against the Visigoths in the early 6th century, the Burgundians were eventually conquered at Autun by the Franks in 532 after a first attempt in the Battle of Vézeronce. The Burgundian kingdom was made part of the Merovingian kingdoms, and the Burgundians themselves were by and large absorbed as well.

Physical appearance
The 5th century Gallo-Roman poet and landowner Sidonius, who at one point lived with the Burgundians, described them as a long-haired people of immense physical size:

Language

The Burgundians and their language were described as Germanic by the poet Sidonius Apollinaris. Herwig Wolfram has interpreted this as being because they had entered Gaul from Germania.

More specifically their language is thought to have belonged to the East Germanic language group, based upon their presumed equivalence to the Burgundians named much earlier by Pliny in the east, and some names and placenames. However this is now considered uncertain. Little is known of the language. Some proper names of Burgundians are recorded, and some words used in the area in modern times are thought to be derived from the ancient Burgundian language, but it is often difficult to distinguish these from Germanic words of other origin, and in any case the modern form of the words is rarely suitable to infer much about the form in the old language.

The language appears to have become extinct during the late 6th century, likely due to the early conversion of the Burgundians to Latin Christianity.

Religion
Somewhere in the east the Burgundians had converted to the Arian Christianity from earlier Germanic paganism. Their Arianism proved a source of suspicion and distrust between the Burgundians and the Catholic Western Roman Empire.

Divisions were evidently healed or healing circa 500, however, as Gundobad, one of the last Burgundian kings, maintained a close personal friendship with Avitus, the bishop of Vienne. Moreover, Gundobad's son and successor, Sigismund, was himself a Catholic, and there is evidence that many of the Burgundian people had converted by this time as well, including several female members of the ruling family.

Law 

The Burgundians left three legal codes, among the earliest from any of the Germanic tribes.

The Liber Constitutionum sive Lex Gundobada ("The Book of Constitutions or Law of Gundobad"), also known as the Lex Burgundionum, or more simply the Lex Gundobada or the Liber, was issued in several parts between 483 and 516, principally by Gundobad, but also by his son, Sigismund. It was a record of Burgundian customary law and is typical of the many Germanic law codes from this period. In particular, the Liber borrowed from the Lex Visigothorum and influenced the later Lex Ripuaria. The Liber is one of the primary sources for contemporary Burgundian life, as well as the history of its kings.

Like many of the Germanic tribes, the Burgundians' legal traditions allowed the application of separate laws for separate ethnicities. Thus, in addition to the Lex Gundobada, Gundobad also issued (or codified) a set of laws for Roman subjects of the Burgundian kingdom, the Lex Romana Burgundionum (The Roman Law of the Burgundians).

In addition to the above codes, Gundobad's son Sigismund later published the Prima Constitutio.

See also
 Dauphiné
 Duchy of Burgundy
 Franche-Comté
 List of ancient Germanic peoples and tribes
 List of kings of Burgundy
 Nibelung (later legends of the Burgundian kings)

References

Sources

 Bury, J. B. The Invasion of Europe by the Barbarians. London: Macmillan and Co., 1928.
 Dalton, O. M. The History of the Franks, by Gregory of Tours. Oxford: The Clarendon Press, 1927.

 Drew, Katherine Fischer. The Burgundian Code. Philadelphia: University of Pennsylvania Press, 1972.

 Gordon, C.D. The Age of Attila. Ann Arbor: University of Michigan Press, 1961.
 Guichard, Rene, Essai sur l'histoire du peuple burgonde, de Bornholm (Burgundarholm) vers la Bourgogne et les Bourguignons, 1965, published by A. et J. Picard et Cie.
 Hartmann, Frederik / Riegger, Ciara. 2021. The Burgundian language and its phylogeny - A cladistical investigation. Nowele 75, p. 42-80.
 

 Murray, Alexander Callander. From Roman to Merovingian Gaul. Broadview Press, 2000.
 Musset, Lucien. The Germanic Invasions: The Making of Europe AD 400–600. University Park, Pennsylvania: The Pennsylvania State University Press, 1975. .
 Nerman, Birger. Det svenska rikets uppkomst. Generalstabens litagrafiska anstalt: Stockholm. 1925.
 Rivers, Theodore John. Laws of the Salian and Ripuarian Franks. New York: AMS Press, 1986.
 Rolfe, J.C., trans, Ammianus Marcellinus. Cambridge, Massachusetts: Harvard University Press, 1950.
 Shanzer, Danuta. 'Dating the Baptism of Clovis.' In Early Medieval Europe, volume 7, pages 29–57. Oxford: Blackwell Publishers Ltd, 1998.
 Shanzer, D. and I. Wood. Avitus of Vienne: Letters and Selected Prose. Translated with an Introduction and Notes. Liverpool: Liverpool University Press, 2002.
 Werner, J. (1953). "Beiträge sur Archäologie des Attila-Reiches", Die Bayerische Akademie der Wissenschaft. Abhandlungen.  Philosophische-philologische und historische Klasse. Münche
 
 Wood, Ian N. "Ethnicity and the Ethnogenesis of the Burgundians". In Herwig Wolfram and Walter Pohl, editors, Typen der Ethnogenese unter besonderer Berücksichtigung der Bayern, volume 1, pages 53–69. Vienna: Denkschriften der Österreichische Akademie der Wissenschaften, 1990.
 Wood, Ian N. The Merovingian Kingdoms. Harlow, England: The Longman Group, 1994.

External links 
 

 
German tribes
Early Germanic peoples
Vandals